Diego Álvarez Chanca (c. 1463 - c. 1515) was a Spanish physician who accompanied Christopher Columbus on his second voyage.

Chanca was a physician-in-ordinary to Ferdinand and Isabella, which is how he was introduced to Columbus. He was appointed by the  Crown of Spain to accompany Columbus' second expedition to America in 1493. Shortly after landing on Hispaniola, Columbus suffered from an attack of malarial fever, which Chanca successfully treated. Several other members of the crew were also treated for malaria during this period.

Chanca's opinion was also sought when Columbus was selecting a site for his first settlement, Isabella. While there, Chanca wrote a letter to the municipal council of his native city of Seville, which was the first document describing the flora, the fauna, the ethnology, and the ethnography of America.

After his return to Spain in February 1494, he published in 1506 a medical treatise entitled Para curar el mal de Costado (The Treatment of Pleurisy), and in 1514, he published a work in Latin criticizing a book entitled De conservanda juventute et retardanda senectute, the work of Arnaldo de Villanova, a brother-physician.

He is also credited with introducing red pepper (capsaicin) and allspice to Spanish cuisine.

References

Bibliography
 
 
 

15th-century births
16th-century deaths
15th-century explorers
Medieval Spanish physicians
16th-century Spanish physicians
Explorers of Central America
15th-century Spanish writers
Court physicians
Spanish explorers of North America